Seligerskaya is a station on the Lyublinsko-Dmitrovskaya line of the Moscow Metro. It is the northern terminus of the line, after Verkhniye Likhobory. The extension of the Lyublinsko-Dmitrovskaya line between Petrovsko-Razumovskaya and Seligerskaya opened on 22 March 2018. It is in Beskudnikovsky District of Moscow, close to the T-crossing of Korovinskoye Highway and Dmitrovskoye Highway.

It will remain the northern terminus of the Lyublinsko-Dmitrovskaya line until Yakhromskaya, Lianozovo, and Fiztekh stations open, which is planned for 2023.

References

Moscow Metro stations
Lyublinsko-Dmitrovskaya Line
Railway stations in Russia opened in 2018
Railway stations located underground in Russia